Shakeem Clarke (born 9 April 1995) is a Barbadian cricketer. He made his first-class debut for Barbados in the 2017–18 Regional Four Day Competition on 26 October 2017.

References

External links
 

1995 births
Living people
Barbadian cricketers
Barbados cricketers
Place of birth missing (living people)